Raed Shaker Jawdat, is an Iraqi General. He graduated from the Iraqi Military College in 1978. He is the commander of the Iraqi Federal Police.

Wars in which he participated 
 Liberation of Jurf al-Sakhar (Operation Ashura)
 Siege of Amirli
 Battle of Baiji (2014–15)
 Second Battle of Tikrit
 Battle of Ramadi (2015–16)

References

External links
 Official Website
 An interview with Raed Shaker Jawdat on Al Mayadeen

Living people
Iraqi Shia Muslims
Iraqi generals
1959 births
Iraqi military leaders
People from Maysan Governorate